Sigurd Ferdinand Olson (April 4, 1899 – January 13, 1982) was an American writer, environmentalist, and advocate for the protection of wilderness.  For more than thirty years, he served as a wilderness guide in the lakes and forests of the Quetico-Superior country of northern Minnesota and northwestern Ontario. He was known honorifically as the Bourgeois — a term the voyageurs of old used of their trusted leaders.

Biography
Born in Chicago, Illinois to Swedish Baptist parents, Olson grew up in northern Wisconsin where he developed his lifelong interest in the outdoors. They moved first to Sister Bay, then Prentice, then Ashland.   In June 1921, Olson took his first canoe trip where he fell in love with the canoe country wilderness of northern Minnesota that would become the Boundary Waters Canoe Area Wilderness (with his help).  His first article, an account of a canoe expedition, was published by the Milwaukee Journal on July 31, 1921. In August of that year, Olson married Elizabeth Dorothy Uhrenholdt, and the two spent their honeymoon on another canoe trip in the Boundary Waters. He worked as a canoe guide for J.C. Russell's outfitters on Fall Lake in Winton, Minnesota, before purchasing the business in 1929.  Circa 1931 Olson ran Border Lakes Outfitters outside of Winton MN on the west end of Fall Lake serving the boundary waters area.

He led canoe expeditions for a group that became known as the "Voyageurs," which routinely included Eric W. Morse, Denis Coolican, Blair Fraser, Tony Lovink, Elliott Rodger, and Omond Solandt.

After studying agriculture, botany, geology, and ecology at Northland College, the University of Wisconsin–Madison, and the University of Illinois, Olson moved to Ely, Minnesota to teach biology at Ely Junior College (now Vermilion Community College). He later chaired the science department and served as dean. in 1947 he resigned from his teaching position and began writing full-time.  He spent most of his life in the Ely area, working as a canoe guide during the summer months, teaching, and writing about the natural history, ecology, and outdoor life in and around the Boundary Waters.

On August 27, 1971, a little over a year after the celebration of the first Earth Day, Northland College hosted its first environmental conference.  Among those invited to address the two-day conference were Senator Gaylord Nelson and Sigurd Olson.  The conference became "the instrument of origin of the Sigurd Olson Environmental Institute," as Robert Matteson, the founder of the institute, wrote.  With energy to move in a new and exciting direction, and guided by the philosophies of Sigurd Olson, the institute opened its doors in spring of 1972, embarking on more than 30 years of serving Northland College and the Lake Superior region.

In 1974, Olson earned the John Burroughs Medal, the highest honor in nature writing. He died on January 13, 1982, of a heart attack while snowshoeing near his home.   He received a tribute from the US Senate on the 100th anniversary of his birth.  David Backes wrote a biography on Olson titled A Wilderness Within - The Life of Sigurd F. Olson which was published in the late 1990s.

In 2014, the Listening Point Foundation acquired Olson’s cabin on Burntside Lake.  The property included the cabin Olson built near his home  where he did his writing, which has since been listed on the National Register of Historic Places.  Everything is as he left it at his unexpected death including his photos, decoys, pipes, books, maps, a collection of rocks and other artifacts.  The typewriter he used to write all his articles, books, and letters still sits on the desk. The last thing he wrote on it is still on the paper in the typewriter: “A New Adventure is coming up / and I’m sure it will be / A good one."

Preservation work

Olson was influential in the protection of the Boundary Waters and helped draft the Wilderness Act of 1964, becoming vice-president of The Wilderness Society from 1963 to 1967 and president 1968 to 1971. He also helped establish Voyageurs National Park in northern Minnesota, Alaska's Arctic National Wildlife Refuge, and Point Reyes National Seashore in California. Sigurd also was a consultant to the Secretary of the Interior Stewart Udall on wilderness and national park issues.

After over 50 years of hard work, Sigurd reached his goal. Full wilderness status was granted to the Boundary Waters Canoe Area Wilderness by Jimmy Carter in 1978, four years before Sigurd died. His hard work was commemorated in many different ways, including in the naming of a central building of YMCA Camp Widjiwagan, located on nearby Burntside Lake.  Olson was president of the National Parks Association and a member of its board of trustees.

List of works
 The Singing Wilderness (1956)
 Listening Point (1958)
 The Lonely Land (1961)
 Runes of the North (1963)
 Open Horizons (1969)
 The Hidden Forest (1969)
 Wilderness Days (1972)
 Reflections From the North Country (1976)
 Of Time and Place (1982)
 Songs of the North. Howard Frank Mosher, ed. (1987)
 The Collected Works of Sigurd F. Olson: The Early Writings, 1921-1934. Mike Link, ed. (1988)
 The Collected Works of Sigurd F. Olson: The College Years, 1935-1944. Mike Link, ed. (1990)
 The Meaning of Wilderness: Essential Articles and Speeches.  Edited and with an Introduction by David Backes. (2001)
 Spirit of the North: The Quotable Sigurd F. Olson.  Edited and with an Introduction by David Backes. (2004)

References

Further reading
 Backes, David. A Wilderness Within: The Life Of Sigurd F. Olson. Minneapolis: University of Minnesota Press, 1997.

External links

 Listening Point Foundation – a non-profit organization dedicated to furthering Sigurd Olson's legacy
 The Sigurd Olson Environmental Institute at Northland College
 Sigurd Olson website at the University of Wisconsin–Milwaukee
 Sigurd Olson at the Minnesota Historical Society's Author Biography Project
The  Sigurd Olson Papers are available for research use at the Minnesota Historical Society.
Interview with David Backes at Listening Point about his Sigurd Olson biography (Part One), Northern Lights Minnesota Author Interview TV Series #437 (1999)
Interview with David Backes at Listening Point about his Sigurd Olson biography (Part Two), Northern Lights Minnesota Author Interview TV Series #438 (1999)

1899 births
1982 deaths
American conservationists
American male non-fiction writers
Northland College (Wisconsin) alumni
University of Illinois alumni
Writers from Chicago
Writers from Minnesota
Writers from Wisconsin
American people of Swedish descent
People from St. Louis County, Minnesota
John Burroughs Medal recipients
University of Wisconsin–Madison alumni
American nature writers
Sierra Club awardees
20th-century American male writers